Swinburne University of Technology Sarawak Campus is the foreign branch campus of Swinburne University and is located in Kuching, Sarawak, Malaysia. Established in 2000, Swinburne Sarawak operates as a partnership between the Sarawak State Government and Swinburne Australia. The initiative behind the Sarawak campus is part of a long-term strategy by Swinburne Australia to "globalize its operations and provide its students with international living, working and learning opportunities".

The Swinburne Sarawak campus operates as a full-fledged branch campus, joining three other Swinburne campuses in Melbourne, Australia, and is under the academic control of Swinburne's Higher Education Division in Australia. Courses offered are identical to those available in Melbourne and graduates are awarded Australian testamurs.

History
As a result of close ties between Sarawak and Australia, the Swinburne University of Technology of Melbourne, Australia was identified by the State Government as a viable partner in assisting the state's educational needs. Following the long-term strategy by Swinburne Australia, and the approval of the then Minister of Education of Malaysia, Najib Tun Razak in 1999,
 the Swinburne Sarawak Institute of Technology was set up within a State Office Complex building at Jalan Simpang Tiga, Kuching, Sarawak.

Operating as a partnership between the Sarawak Foundation and the Sarawak Higher Education Foundation, the campus welcomed the first batch of 130 students in August 2000.

Swinburne Sarawak Institute of Technology was officially granted status as a university branch campus on 10 June 2004, effectively becoming Swinburne's sixth and latest campus, joining five other campuses in Melbourne, Australia. The university was since then known as Swinburne University of Technology, Sarawak Campus and was, at the time, the fifth branch campus university in the country. Student population was at 700.

Work on a campus expansion started in late 2005. The project was wholly funded by the Sarawak Government. Construction on the extended campus was completed in August 2008. Eight new custom designed buildings were added to the campus, increasing the total number of buildings to 12.

RM50 million has been invested into further transforming the Sarawak campus throughout the course of 2019–22.

Location

Swinburne Sarawak is located on a 6.5 ha (16.5 acre) campus in Jalan Simpang Tiga, Kuching.

The campus is located about 10 minutes away from the city centre and is surrounded by commercial and residential areas.

Administration
The university operates as a Branch Campus of Swinburne University of Technology, of Melbourne, Australia. It is 75% owned by the Sarawak Government and 25% owned by Swinburne, Australia.

Swinburne Sarawak's day-to-day affairs is administered by Pro Vice-Chancellor and Chief Executive Officer Ir. Professor Lau Hieng Ho.

The current Chief Minister of Sarawak The Right Honourable Datuk Patinggi (Dr) Abang Haji Abdul Rahman Zohari Bin Tun Datuk Abang Haji Openg was installed as its third Pro Chancellor in October 2017.

Faculties and programmes

At the Sarawak campus, there are two Faculties, seven Schools and more than 25 programmes namely:

Faculty of Engineering, Computing and Science

School of Engineering 

 Robotics and Mechatronics Engineering
 Electrical and Electronic Engineering
 Mechanical Engineering
 Civil Engineering
 Master of Construction Management by Coursework

School of Information and Communications Technologies 

 Computer Science (major in Cybersecurity, Internet of Things, Software Development, Data Science or Artificial Intelligence)
 Information and Communication Technology (major in Network Technology or Software Technology)

School of Chemical Engineering and Science 

 Chemical Engineering
 Biotechnology
 Environmental Science

Faculty of Business, Design and Arts

School of Business 

 Accounting
 Accounting and Finance
 Finance
 Human Resource Management
 International Business
 Management
 Management and Digital Media
 Marketing
 Master of Business Administration (International) by Coursework

School of Design and Arts 

 Multimedia Design
 Graphic Design
 Master of Arts (TESOL) by Coursework

Diploma 

 Diploma of Business Management

Swinburne's Diploma of Business Management with a specialisation in Management is a 2.5-year programme that provides students with the knowledge and skills to enter the workforce directly or progress into a degree programme upon completion at the Sarawak or Melbourne campus. It is available for school-leavers who have completed SPM, O Level or any other equivalent qualifications.

The undergraduate degree programmes are available to students who have completed the Swinburne Foundation Studies, STPM, A Level or other equivalent qualifications. The programmes focus on practical skills where students can benefit from opportunities to connect with industry and engage in interdisciplinary projects.

In addition to the postgraduate degree by coursework programmes, the university also offers postgraduate degree by research. It is available for those with a recognised bachelor's degree and students can study on a part-time or full-time basis.

School of Foundation Studies 

 Business
 Design
 Information Technology/Multimedia
 Engineering/Science

In addition to the listed programmes, the School of Foundation Studies also offers six Intensive English courses. Foundation Studies is a pre-university preparatory course designed to help students meet the entry requirements for bachelor's degree studies. It is available for school-leavers who have completed SPM, O Level or any other equivalent qualifications.

School of Research 
Swimburne established 16 research centres, focusing on business, education, technology, clean energy, and environment.

Swinburne Innovation Malaysia Sdn Bhd (SWIM) 
As the subsidiary company and commercial arm of the university, SWIM aims to encourage industry in Malaysia to invest in R&D activities undertaken by researchers at Swinburne Sarawak.

References

Educational institutions established in 2000
Universities and colleges in Sarawak
Buildings and structures in Kuching
Engineering universities and colleges in Malaysia
2000 establishments in Malaysia
Australia–Malaysia relations
Private universities and colleges in Malaysia